Antonina is a genus of mealybugs in the family Pseudococcidae. There are at least three described species in Antonina.

Species
 Antonina crawii Cockerell, 1900
 Antonina graminis (Maskell, 1897)
 Antonina pretiosa Ferris, 1953 (noxious bamboo mealybug)

References

Further reading

 
 
 
 

Sternorrhyncha genera
Pseudococcidae